HMS Smilax was originally launched as Tact (PG-98), an  built for the United States Navy by Collingwood Shipyards, Ltd., Collingwood, Ontario, Canada

War service 
Tact was launched on 14 November 1942. However, before seeing any service in the United States Navy, the ship was transferred to the United Kingdom under the Lend-Lease program on 21 June 1943 and served the Royal Navy as HMS Smilax until after the end of hostilities in Europe.

Argentine service 

Tact was returned to the United States on 18 October 1946 and sold by the Maritime Commission to the Argentine Navy, where she served ARA República until her decommissioning in 1966. She saw some action during the 1955 Revolución Libertadora, when the República defended the rebel naval base at Mar del Plata.

References

External links
USS Tact (PG-98)
NavSource Online: Gunboat Photo Archive - HMS Smilax (K 280) ex-Tact (PG 98)

 

Smilax
World War II naval ships of the United States
Ships built in Collingwood, Ontario
1942 ships